KPOR (90.3 FM) is a radio station licensed to serve Welches, Oregon, and the Portland, Oregon, United States, radio market. The station is owned, and the broadcast license held, by the Educational Media Foundation.

History
The 90.3 frequency in Welches has been network-fed its entire life, beginning as an Air 1 outlet in 2001.

The station was heard on 102.7 in Gresham and 92.7 in Vancouver Washington to improve its signal in the Portland area.

Two other translators in the Portland area at 95.9 and 96.3 were rebroadcasting KLVP 88.7.

In 2013, KXPC moved from Eugene to Portland.

What was KLVP on 88.7 took the KZRI call letters and Air1 affiliation.

KXPC, which briefly was on 97.9, took the KLVP callsign from 88.7.

Around the same time, 92.7 was upgraded and moved to Portland, continuing to rebroadcast KZRI, now at 88.7.

The 96.3 signal was a rebroadcast of KZRI until its move to 103.7, when it was leased to iHeart Media and started broadcasting as Tailgate Country 103.7.

The 102.7 signal was leased to Alpha Media to rebroadcast KXTG, leaving 92.7 as the Air1 signal directly in Portland.

KXPC's repeater in Portland is on 95.9.

On May 12, 2021, KXPC changed its call sign to KPOR.

See also
KNRQ
KLVP

References

External links

POR
Radio stations established in 2001
2001 establishments in Oregon
Educational Media Foundation radio stations